Gymnothorax phalarus is a moray eel found in the eastern Pacific Ocean around Baja California, Mexico, and Peru. It was first named by Bussing in 1998, and can reach a maximum length of 93 cm.

References

phalarus
Fish of the Pacific Ocean
Fish of Mexico
Fish of Peru
Fish described in 1998